Visalia is the fifth-largest city in the San Joaquin Valley of California.

Visalia may also refer to several places:
 Downtown Visalia, California
 Greater Visalia Area, California
 Visalia Municipal Airport
 Visalia, Kentucky, a former city

See also